Prof. Barbara Ann Wilson OBE (born 1941)  is the founder of the Oliver Zangwill Centre for Neuropsychological Rehabilitation in Ely, Cambridgeshire. She was appointed an OBE for her work in brain injury rehabilitation over 40 years  for "medical rehabilitation". She was a clinical psychologist, and is now (2019) retired. She was shortlisted for a Lifetime Achievement Award in the NHS70 Parliamentary Awards in 2018 for her dedication to brain injury rehabilitation.

Career 
Wilson spent her early career working with children with developmental delay, and brain injury, which influenced her career direction. She says:She had a brain rehabilitation centre named after her in 2007. A centre in Quito Ecuador was named the "Centro de Rehabilitacion Neurologico Integral: Dra Barbara Wilson" and it was opened in honour of her work.

Life 
Barbara A. Wilson qualified as a clinical psychologist in 1977. She worked at the Rivermead Rehabilitation Centre in Oxford, then at Charing Cross Hospital and the Medical Research Council's Cognition and Brain Sciences Unit in Cambridge. She established the Oliver Zangwill Centre for Neuropsychological Rehabilitation at the Princess of Wales Hospital in Ely in 1996. She is the founder and editor of the journal Neuropsychological Rehabilitation. Wilson is a Fellow of the Academy of Medical Sciences, the Academy of Social Sciences and the British Psychological Society (BPS) and past president of the British Neuropsychological Society and the International Neuropsychological Society. The BPS Barbara Wilson Lifetime Achievement Award, the highest UK professional award for clinical neuropsychologists, is named after her. Wilson was appointed an OBE in the New Year's Honours List in 1998 for services to medical rehabilitation. She ran the London marathon, in 2008, in close to six hours and ran for a charity fund.

Publications 
Wilson has written and edited several books, chapters and papers including:
The Assessment, Evaluation and Rehabilitation of Everyday Memory Problems: Selected Papers of Barbara A. Wilson (2013)
Case Studies in Neuropsychological Rehabilitation (1999)
Essentials of Neuropsychological Rehabilitation (Wilson and Betteridge 2019)
Life After Brain Injury: Survivors' Stories (Wilson et al. 2013)
Memory Rehabilitation: Integrating Theory and Practice (2009)
Neuropsychological Rehabilitation: The International Handbook (Wilson et al., eds, 2017)
Neuropsychological Rehabilitation: Theory, Models, Therapy and Outcome (Wilson et al. 2009)

Awards 
Wilson has published more than 200 peer-reviewed manuscripts, 26 books, as well as eight neuropsychological tests.

Her awards include:
 (1998) OBE for services to rehabilitation;
 Four lifetime achievement awards, one from the British Psychological Society, one from the International Neuropsychological Society, one from the National Academy of Neuropsychology and one from the Encephalitis Society;
 (2011) Ramon Y Cahal award, the International Neuropsychiatric Association;
 (2014) honorary degree from The University of Cordoba, Argentina;
 (2014)  M.B. Shapiro award, The Division of Clinical Psychology (The British Psychological Society) for Distinguished Contributions to Clinical Psychology.

References 

Neuropsychologists
British women neuroscientists
British neuroscientists
Officers of the Order of the British Empire
Living people
1941 births
Fellows of the Academy of Medical Sciences (United Kingdom)
Fellows of the Academy of Social Sciences
Fellows of the British Psychological Society
Alumni of the University of Reading
Alumni of the University of London